Urbinum Hortense was an ancient Roman town of central Italy, of uncertain location, mentioned by Pliny the Elder in a roughly alphabetical and contextless list (NH 3.114). Until the mid-20th century, it was sometimes assumed to have been the ancestor of the modern town of Urbino; but that city is on the Metauro River and in the same list Pliny mentions an Urbinum Mataurense, a better fit: most topographers therefore did not make the identification.

In the early 1930s, G. Bizzózero, an amateur archaeologist of Trevi, found ancient remains on a hilltop in Umbria near Collemancio in the comune of Cannara not far from his hometown, and declared them to be the ruins of Urbinum Hortense. There is indeed a rather sizable town on that hill, where excavations have continued sporadically; but its identification is mere surmise, although it has acquired currency by being taken up on widely disseminated tourist and automotive maps of Umbria.

References
"Urvinum Hortense" (Thayer's Gazetteer of Italy).

Roman sites of Umbria
Former populated places in Italy
Archaeological sites in Umbria